One of the Boys is a 2008 album by Katy Perry, or its title track.

One of the Boys may also refer to:

Music
 One of the Boys (Gretchen Wilson album) (2007) or its title track
 One of the Boys (Roger Daltrey album) (1977) or its title track
 "One of the Boys" (Mott the Hoople song) (1972)
 "One of the Boys", a song by Huey Lewis and the News from Weather
 "One of the Boys", a 1992 song by Julia Fordham from (Love Moves in) Mysterious Ways
 "One of the Boys", a song by John Lennon from the John Lennon Signature Box series

Television
 One of the Boys (1982 TV series), an American sitcom
 One of the Boys (1989 TV series), an American sitcom
 One of the Boys (Philippine TV series) (2014) 
 "One of the Boys", a 1990 episode of The Bill
 "One of the Boys", a 2004 episode of Blue Heelers 
 "One of the Boys", a 1989 episode of Bordertown
 "One of the Boys", a 2001 episode of Drop the Beat
 "One of the Boys", a 1962 episode of Leave It to Beaver
 "One of the Boys", a 2016 episode of The Loud House
 "One of the Boys", a 2007 episode of My Family
 "One of the Boys", a 1973 episode of The New Dick Van Dyke Show
 "One of the Boys", a 1955 episode of The Stu Erwin Show
 "One of the Boys", a 1986 episode of Valerie (also known as The Hogan Family)
 "One of the Boys", a 1979 episode of The White Shadow

See also
 Just One of the Guys, a 1985 film
 Old boy network, social and business connections among school graduates
 Old Boys, former pupils of primary and secondary schools
 One of the Guys (disambiguation)